Theology proper is the sub-discipline of systematic theology which deals specifically with the being, attributes and works of God. In Christian theology, and within the Trinitarian setting, this includes Paterology (the study of God the Father), Christology (the study of Jesus Christ) and Pneumatology (the study of the Holy Spirit). 


See also

References

Footnotes

Bibliography

 
 

Systematic theology
Christian terminology